Estonia participated in the Eurovision Song Contest 2007 with the song "Partners in Crime" written by Berit Veiber and Hendrik Sal-Saller. The song was performed by Gerli Padar. The Estonian broadcaster Eesti Televisioon (ETV) organised the national final Eurolaul 2007 in order to select the Estonian entry for the 2007 contest in Helsinki, Finland. Ten songs competed in the national final and the winner was selected over two rounds of public voting. In the first round, the top three were selected to qualify to the superfinal. In the superfinal, "Partners in Crime" performed by Gerli Padar was selected as the winner.

Estonia competed in the semi-final of the Eurovision Song Contest which took place on 10 May 2007. Performing during the show in position 23, "Partners in Crime" was not announced among the top 10 entries of the semi-final and therefore did not qualify to compete in the final. It was later revealed that Estonia placed twenty-second out of the 27 participating countries in the semi-final with 33 points.

Background 

In 2006, "Through My Window" performed by Sandra failed to qualify Estonia to the final where the song placed eighteenth in the semi-final.

The Estonian national broadcaster, Eesti Televisioon (ETV), broadcasts the event within Estonia and organises the selection process for the nation's entry. Since their debut, the Estonian broadcaster has organised national finals that feature a competition among multiple artists and songs in order to select Estonia's entry for the Eurovision Song Contest. The Eurolaul competition has been organised since 1996 in order to select Estonia's entry and on 13 October 2006, ETV announced the organisation of Eurolaul 2007 in order to select the nation's 2007 entry.

Before Eurovision

Eurolaul 2007 
Eurolaul 2007 was the fourteenth edition of the Estonian national selection Eurolaul, which selected Estonia's entry for the Eurovision Song Contest 2007. The competition consisted of a ten-song final on 3 February 2007 at the ETV studios in Tallinn, hosted by Marko Reikop and Maarja-Liis Ilus and broadcast on ETV as well as streamed online at the broadcaster's official website etv.ee. The national final was watched by 302,000 viewers in Estonia.

Competing entries 
The 10 finalists were selected by ETV via composers directly invited for the competition. The composers, who had to submit their entries up until 11 December 2006, both created the song and selected the performer for their entries. The names of the composers that were invited to participate were announced on 13 October 2006 and were:

 Alar Kotkas, Pearu Paulus and Ilmar Laisaar
 Eda-Ines Etti
 Elmar Liitmaa
 Hendrik Sal-Saller
 Koit Toome
 Kristjan Kasearu
 Lenna Kuurmaa
 Priit Pajusaar and Glen Pilvre
 Soul Militia
 Sven Lõhmus

The selected songs were announced on 27 January 2007. Among the competing artists were previous Eurovision Song Contest entrants Koit Toome, who represented Estonia in 1998, the group Soul Militia, which represented Estonia as 2XL in 2001 together with Tanel Padar and Dave Benton, Ines, who represented Estonia in 2000, Laura Põldvere, who represented Estonia in 2005 as part of the group Suntribe, and the band Vanilla Ninja, which represented Switzerland in 2005. Deva Deva Dance and Gerli Padar have both competed in previous editions of Eurolaul.

Final
The final took place on 3 February 2007. Ten songs competed during the show and the winner was selected over two rounds of public televoting. In the first round, the top three entries proceeded to the second round; the public vote in the first round registered 55,324 votes. In the second round, "Partners in Crime" performed by Gerli Padar was selected as the winner entirely by a public televote. The public televote in the superfinal registered 118,949 votes, with votes only counting towards the top three songs.

At Eurovision 
According to Eurovision rules, all nations with the exceptions of the host country, the "Big Four" (France, Germany, Spain and the United Kingdom) and the ten highest placed finishers in the 2006 contest are required to qualify from the semi-final on 10 May 2007 in order to compete for the final on 12 May 2007; the top ten countries from the semi-final progress to the final. On 12 March 2007, a special allocation draw was held which determined the running order for the semi-final and Estonia was set to perform in position 23, following the entry from Hungary and before the entry from Belgium.

The semi-final and the final were broadcast in Estonia on ETV with commentary by Marko Reikop. The Estonian spokesperson, who announced the Estonian votes during the final, was Laura Põldvere who had previously represented Estonia in the Eurovision Song Contest in 2005 as part of the group Suntribe.

Semi-final 

Gerli Padar took part in technical rehearsals on 3 and 4 May, followed by dress rehearsals on 9 and 10 May. The Estonian performance featured Gerli Padar performing a choreographed routine on stage in a black catsuit with three dancers: Aleksandr Makarov, Marko Kiigajaan and Martin Parmas. The stage displayed gold and black colours at the beginning which transitioned to blue, white and black colours with graffiti-style scrawl appearing on the LED screens and circular patterns of spotlights appearing in time to the music behind the performers. The performance, which began with Padar being carried in on the shoulders of the dancers, also featured the use of a wind machine. Gerli Padar was also joined by two backing vocalists: Johanna Münter and Mirjam Mesak.

At the end of the show, Estonia was not announced among the top 10 entries in the semi-final and therefore failed to qualify to compete in the final. It was later revealed that Estonia placed 23rd in the semi-final, receiving a total of 33 points.

Voting 
Below is a breakdown of points awarded to Estonia and awarded by Estonia in the semi-final and grand final of the contest. The nation awarded its 12 points to Latvia in the semi-final and to Russia in the final of the contest.

Points awarded to Estonia

Points awarded by Estonia

References

2007
Countries in the Eurovision Song Contest 2007
Eurovision